WNFO (1430 AM) is a radio station broadcasting a Spanish Variety format. Licensed to Hilton Head, South Carolina, United States, the station is currently owned by Walter M. Czura.

History
The station went on the air as WBUG in 1953 by a gentleman farmer and country music recording artist, Sam Malphrus. Malphrus sold the station to a small town publishing company owned by Joseph Sink. Mr. Sink sold the station in 1975 to some business partners who worked for ABC radio in New York. One of the partners, Dale Hawkins moved to the Hilton Head area to work as the General Manager of the station. During its heyday in the mid 70's some stronger DJ's were hired and the station was known as "Rockin 143 - WBUG"
Even though the station was listed in the Savannah, Georgia broadcasting market, its low power pretty much only serviced its licensed area of Ridgland and the Greater Jasper County area. There were however some Savannah ratings and the station did get nominated a few times for the "Addy Award" for its talented production team. 
In the early 80's the station was sold again to a marketing firm in Hilton Head who used it for promoting the Hilton Head Island resort area, basically becoming a full-time "infomercial" for local tourism. Permission was granted through the FCC to move its city of license to Hilton Head. It is believed to have gone "dark" meaning it went off the air for a short amount of time before the frequency was sold in 1984
On January 16, 1986, the station changed its call sign to WCOG, on April 13, 1992 to the current WNFO,

References

External links

NFO
Radio stations established in 1953
1953 establishments in South Carolina
NFO